Hickory Creek is one of two commuter rail stations along Metra's Rock Island District line that are located in Mokena, Illinois. The station is located at 9430 Hickory Creek Drive east of a former section of US 45, near Exit 145A on Interstate 80, which is the current southbound exit to US 45. In Metra's fare-based system, Hickory Creek is in zone F. As of 2018, Hickory Creek is the 45th busiest of Metra's 236 non-downtown stations, with an average of 1,079 weekday boardings.

As of 2022, Hickory Creek is served by 21 trains in each direction on weekdays, by 10 inbound trains and 11 outbound trains on Saturdays, and by eight trains in each direction on Sundays.

Hickory Creek was built in 1993, and is a fully enclosed brick-faced shelter with no ticket agents. Parking is available in front of the station on Hickory Creek Drive. Currently, no bus connections are available at the station.

Tracks
There are two tracks at Hickory Creek. Trains from Chicago run on track 2 (the north track) and trains to Chicago run on track 1 (the south track.)

References

External links

Metra stations in Illinois
Railway stations in the United States opened in 1993
Railway stations in Will County, Illinois